Jacob Adolf Hägg (29 June 1850, Östergarn – 1 March 1928, Bjuråker) was a Swedish composer.

Hägg studied piano at the Stockholm Conservatory from 1865 to 1870, as well as composition in Copenhagen with Niels Wilhelm Gade and in Berlin with Friedrich Kiel.  Due to mental illness, he spent the years 1880 to 1895 in a hospital.  He then worked as a pianist and composer in Hedvigsfors, Sweden, and continued to do so after moving to Norway between 1900 and 1909 and resettling in Sweden at Hudiksvall.

Hägg composed four symphonies and other orchestral and choral works, chamber music, a collection of Little Nordic Songs without Words for piano, ten piano suites, and pieces for cello and for organ.

His cousin Gustaf Hägg (1867–1925) was also a composer.

External links

1850 births
1928 deaths
Romantic composers
Royal College of Music, Stockholm alumni
Swedish classical composers
Swedish male classical composers
Swedish classical pianists
Male classical pianists
19th-century classical pianists
20th-century Swedish male musicians
20th-century Swedish musicians
19th-century male musicians